Paul Jonathan Goldsmith (born 1971) is a New Zealand politician and, since the , a list member of the New Zealand House of Representatives. He is the National Party spokesperson for justice, and workplace relations and safety.

Early life
Goldsmith was born in 1971 in the Auckland suburb of Mount Eden. He descends from Charles George Goldsmith, a migrant from Liverpool who settled in the East Cape area early in New Zealand's colonial history. Charles Goldsmith had four wives—two Māori (Ngāti Porou), and two pākehā—fathering 16 children. However Goldsmith has clarified that he is not himself of Māori descent.

Goldsmith attended Auckland Grammar School and received an MA in history from the University of Auckland. Goldsmith then worked as a press secretary and speech writer for Phil Goff (Labour), Simon Upton (National) and John Banks (then a National MP). In 2000 Goldsmith became a public relations adviser and worked for Tranz Rail and the University of Auckland.

Career before politics 
He has written the biographies of John Banks, Don Brash, William Gallagher, Alan Gibbs and Te Hemara Tauhia as well as a history of taxes, Puketutu Island and a history of the Fletcher Building construction company.

His Don Brash biography, Brash: A Biography, was a source of controversy. When it was released in 2005 he maintained it was not commissioned by the National Party, but investigative journalist Nicky Hager revealed it was indeed commissioned by the National Party and was in fact the party's first big-budget item in the  campaign.

Auckland city councillor 
Goldsmith successfully stood for the Auckland City Council Hobson Ward at the 2007 local body elections as a member of Citizens & Ratepayers. He was appointed deputy finance chairman by Mayor John Banks and chaired the community services committee. During his term, Goldsmith was criticised by the Auckland City Mission and the Green Party for instructing council officers to investigate removing homeless people from the city centre and refusing to rule out arresting homeless people to do so.

He stood for Citizens & Ratepayers in the Albert-Eden-Roskill ward at the 2010 Auckland elections but placed third after Christine Fletcher and Cathy Casey in the two-member ward.

Member of Parliament

2005 general election
Goldsmith contested the Maungakiekie electorate in the 2005 general election for the National Party. He was defeated by the incumbent, Labour's Mark Gosche, and due to his low list placing (59 on the National Party list), did not enter Parliament.

Fifth National Government, 2011–2017
Goldsmith stood in the Epsom electorate at the 2011 general election, but lost the electorate vote to John Banks, who earlier in 2011 had joined ACT New Zealand. Since 2011, National party leaders have lent support to ACT candidates running in the Epsom electorate to keep the party in Parliament. Goldsmith was ranked 39th on the National Party list and was elected as a list MP sitting in the 50th Parliament. During his first term in parliament, Goldsmith was initially deputy chairperson and subsequently (from 2013) chairperson of the Finance and Expenditure select committee. He was also a member of the Local Government and Environment select committee.

Ranked 30th, Goldsmith was re-elected as a list MP. He was a Cabinet Minister in the 5th National Government, holding the portfolios of Science and Innovation, Tertiary Education, Skills and Employment, Commerce and Consumer Affairs and Regulatory Reform. He served on the Education and Science and Social Services select committees.

Sixth Labour Government, 2017–present
At the beginning of the parliamentary term, as an opposition MP, he was the party spokesperson for Arts, Culture and Heritage. Following the March 2018 National Party portfolio reshuffle, Goldsmith became spokesperson for Revenue and Economic and Regional Development. Later in the year, he lost the Revenue portfolio, but became Transport spokesperson. In 2019, Goldsmith assumed the spokesperson role for Finance and Infrastructure. In addition to his finance and infrastructure roles, Goldsmith became spokesperson for state-owned enterprises between February and May 2020 and Earthquake Commission spokesperson between May and November 2020.

Under the leadership of Judith Collins and following the pre-election budget which was found to have several errors, Goldsmith lost the Finance and Earthquake Commission role and became spokesperson for Education. Between March and May 2020, Goldsmith was a member of the  Epidemic Response Committee, a select committee that considers the government's response to the COVID-19 pandemic. Goldsmith has stated that he would vote against the legalisation of cannabis at the 2020 referendum. He believes New Zealand should wait and observe the effects of cannabis legalisation in Canada before making a decision.

He was re-elected as a list MP. Since November 2020, Goldsmith has been a member of the Education and Workforce select committee. In June 2021, Goldsmith attracted controversy for stating that colonisation had been "on balance" good for Māori because it had led to the creation of New Zealand. He believes that New Zealand's reconnection with the rest of the world following isolation for centuries was always going to be a "traumatic experience".

In mid March 2022, Goldsmith was promoted from 12th to 5th place in National Party leader Christopher Luxon's shadow cabinet.

Private life
Goldsmith is married with four children. He is a 2nd dan black belt in Tae Kwon Do.

Bibliography

 Goldsmith, Paul and Bassett, Michael, The Myers, David Ling Publishing Ltd, Auckland, 2007.

Notes

References

External links 

 Paul Goldsmith: National List MP based in Epsom
 Paul Goldsmith - Penguin Books New Zealand

|-

1971 births
Living people
New Zealand National Party MPs
New Zealand list MPs
Auckland City Councillors
New Zealand writers
People from Mount Eden
Unsuccessful candidates in the 2005 New Zealand general election
Government ministers of New Zealand
Members of the New Zealand House of Representatives
People educated at Auckland Grammar School
University of Auckland alumni
Date of birth missing (living people)
21st-century New Zealand politicians
Candidates in the 2017 New Zealand general election
Candidates in the 2020 New Zealand general election